Lorella De Luca (17 September 1940 – 9 January 2014) was an Italian film, television, and voice actress. One of the most recognized ingenues of Italian cinema during the mid-to-late 1950s, she is best known for having played naive young girls in dramas and comedies.

She was born in Florence, Italy and, following her "discovery" at age 14, made her acting debut in the Federico Fellini film Il bidone (1955). De Luca's breakout role, however, came a year later following her performance in Dino Risi's comedy Poor, But Beautiful (1956) and continued on in the genre, with appearances in Mario Monicelli films A Tailor's Maid (1957) and Doctor and the Healer (1957), as well as in Duccio Tessari's Spaghetti Westerns A Pistol for Ringo (1965) and its sequel The Return of Ringo (1965) with Giuliano Gemma.

Biography
Lorella De Luca was born in Florence, Italy on 17 September 1940. "Discovered" at the age of fourteen by a director who followed De Luca home, and convinced her father that she should be in films, she made her feature film debut in Federico Fellini's Il bidone (1955) as Patrizia, the young daughter of middle-aged con man Augusto (Broderick Crawford). She subsequently attended the prestigious "Centro Sperimentale di Cinematografia" (Experimental Cinematography Centre) in Rome, and the following year appeared in what would be her breakout role in Dino Risi's Poor, But Beautiful (1956) alongside other young actors Marisa Allasio, Renato Salvatori and Maurizio Arena. The success of the film made De Luca one of the most popular ingenues of Italian cinema; her freshness and grace endeared her to the public.

De Luca was one of several women romantically involved with her Poor, But Beautiful co-star Maurizio Arena. She co-starred with Arena in Il principe fusto (1960), a film which he co-wrote, produced and directed. Their relationship created a minor scandal when it was revealed by the Italian media that Arena, after publicly announcing his intention to wed Anna Maria Pierangeli, was also engaged to De Luca.

She specialized in the character of the naive young girl, a kind of an Italian Sandra Dee, and appeared in a series of hit comedies: Fathers and Sons (1957) and The Doctor and the Sorcerer (1957) by Mario Monicelli, the latter starring Vittorio de Sica and Marcello Mastroianni, Sunday Is Always Sunday (1958) by Camillo Mastrocinque, First Love (1958) by Mario Camerini, Gianni Franciolini's romantic comedy Love on the Riviera (1958), and many others. In 1958, De Luca joined Alessandra Panaro and Mario Riva as a show girl in the popular TV quiz show Il Musichiere (The Musician). She also had minor roles in "sword-and-sandal" and "muscleman" films, often being cast as a princess or slave girl, such as Sheba and the Gladiator (1959) and Sign of the Gladiator (1965).

With the beginning of the 1960s, De Luca received more and more roles in commercial films. She had a brief, but memorable, foray into the Spaghetti Western genre. In 1965, under the pseudonym "Hally Hammond", she had supporting roles in A Pistol for Ringo and its sequel, The Return of Ringo, both directed by her future husband Duccio Tessari. De Luca appeared in nine other films directed by her husband, most notably, Una voglia da morire (1965) and Kiss Kiss...Bang Bang (1966), between 1965 and 1978. After 1967, with the birth of their two daughters Federica and Fiorenza Tessari, in addition to her losing interest as a character actor, she accepted only occasional parts during the next decade.

Her last acting roles were in The Fifth Commandment (1978) and the 1984 television miniseries Nata d'amore. She was actively involved in her husband's later career and was first assistant director in his final film There Was a Castle with Forty Dogs (1990). De Luca made one last appearance in Bonus malus (1993) and retired from the film industry after Tessari's death the following year.

Marriage
De Luca starred in a total of nine films directed by Tessari, whom she married in 1971, in addition to working behind the scenes as an assistant director.

Death
De Luca died on 9 January 2014, aged 73, after a long battle with a brain tumor, which had caused her to lose her vision sometime before her death.

Filmography
As an actress

As an assistant director

Television

Video games

References

Further reading
Bertarelli, Massimo. Il cinema italiano in 100 film: i 100 film da salvare. Rome: Gremese Editore, 2004. 
Bruschini, Antonio and Antonio Tentori, ed. Western all'italiana: The Specialists. Firenze: Glittering lmages, 1998.
Giacovelli, Enrico. La commedia all'italiana. 2nd ed. Rome: Gremese Editore, 1995. 
Giusti, Marco. Dizionario del Western all'Italiana. Italy: Arnoldo Mondadori Editore, 2007.
Masi, Stefano and Enrico Lancia. Les séductrices du cinéma italien. Rome: Gremese Editore, 1997.

External links

 

1940 births
2014 deaths
Actors from Florence
Italian film actresses
Italian television actresses
Italian voice actresses
Spaghetti Western actresses
20th-century Italian actresses
Centro Sperimentale di Cinematografia alumni
Deaths from brain cancer in Italy